Socialist Alternatives was the British section of the International Revolutionary Marxist Tendency (IRMT), a formerly Trotskyist Pabloite group based in Paris.

Being a small group in the UK, it was best known for the Marxist magazine of the same name partially edited by Keir Starmer from 1986 to 1987. The magazine is believed to have been produced by the Pabloist International Revolutionary Marxist Tendency (IRMT) and advertised its events and publications, although one of the authors identified it as being an outgrowth of the Socialist Society connected with Ralph Miliband and Hilary Wainwright. Paul Mason has called it a "Trotskyite front magazine", although this is disputed. The French Trotskyist journalist Maurice Najman was also cited as a key supporter.

Its politics were defined by one of its later authors Andrew Coates as being "aligned to the European ‘alternative’ movements of the time which stood for ecology, feminism and self-management. These were forerunners of later radical green-left groups, Los Indignados, Podemos, the left of Labour and similar currents within social democratic parties."

It was described by the left wing magazine Chartist as "the human face of the hard left". Peter Hitchens described Socialist Alternative'''s "preoccupation with sexual politics and green issues" as presaging the politics of all today's major British politicians.

The magazine included articles by Michalis Raptis,Socialist Alternatives v1 no2 October November 1986, pages 31 to 33 the leader of the International Revolutionary Marxist Tendency and the left wing Labour MP Eric Heffer, Peter Tatchell as well as an interview with Tony Benn.Interview with Keir Starmer talking about the Benn interview on Nick Robinson's Talking politics, linked here There were also advertisements for Michael Raptis's "Self Management Lectures" and IRMT publications. Keir Starmer wrote articles on the Wapping strike,Socialist Alternatives v2 no1 April May 1987, pages 7 and 8 the 1986 TUC conference, criticising Labour leader Neil Kinnock's moves towards the market economy, a book review of Eric Heffer's Labour's Future'', Trade Unions and pluralism, an interview with Tony Benn and left wing approaches to local government.

The magazine was still publishing in 1989 and 1994.

References

Defunct political magazines published in the United Kingdom
Defunct Trotskyist organisations in the United Kingdom